The following lists events that happened during 2016 in the Central African Republic.

Incumbents
Catherine Samba-Panza, Acting President, 23 January 2014-current
Mahamat Kamoun, Acting Prime Minister, 10 August 2014-current

Events
Many of the candidates in the 2015 general election call on election authorities to stop counting votes, alleging voter fraud.
United Nations troops operating under MINUSCA were hit with a new round of sexual abuse accusations.
The Lord's Resistance Army conducts multiple attacks the eastern CAR, killing one and kidnapping several civilians

References

 
2010s in the Central African Republic
the Central African Republic
the Central African Republic
Years of the 21st century in the Central African Republic